Snehlata Nath (born 27 December 1965) is an Indian activist known for her work with the Nilgiris. She has received the Jamnalal Bajaj Award and the Nari Shakti Puraskar.

Life
Nath was born in 1965.

She was a founding director of Keystone Foundation which started in 1993. The foundation decided to tackle poverty and the Nilgiris people were an obvious target. She could have tried to operate from Delhi but she knew that she would need to be close. The foundation established its base at Kotagiri.

The Fairwild foundation was established in 2008 to create a sustainable and fair trading system for wild-collected plant ingredients. Nath serves on their advisory panel.

In 2013 she was given the Jamnalal Bajaj Award in 2013 for her "Outstanding Contribution in Application of Science and Technology for Rural Development". That award was made by the President of India – Pranab Mukherjee.

In 2019 she was invited to the Presidential Palace, the Rashtrapati Bhavan in New Delhi. She was one of 41 women to receive the highest civilian honour for women in India - Nari Shakti Puraskar. The award was made by the President of India – Ramnath Kovind. Nath had been working then in eco-development and sustainability at the Nilgiri Biosphere Reserve for 26 years.

References

1965 births
Living people